Leonardo Semplici (born 18 July 1967) is an Italian professional football coach who is the current manager of Serie A side Spezia.

Playing career
His playing career mostly consisted of amateur and minor league players with Tuscan teams such as Lucchese.

Coaching career
In 2004 Semplici took over from Eccellenza Tuscany club Sangimignano, bringing them back to Serie D. He successively took over at Figline, bringing the Eccellenza amateurs all the way up to Lega Pro Prima Divisione in his four years at the helm of the team. He then had two short stints as head coach of two more Tuscan teams, Arezzo and Pisa, before Fiorentina decided to appoint him as their new youth coach.

In December 2014 he took over at SPAL, guiding the Lega Pro club to Serie B promotion in 2016 and then to a surprising run for a Serie A promotion spot in his first Serie B season. On 13 May 2017, SPAL became the first team to win promotion from the 2016–17 Serie B, thus ensuring a spot in the 2017–18 Serie A, the first time in the top flight since 49 years for the small Ferrara-based club. The club remained in Serie A for the 2018-19 season, finishing in 13th position with 42 points. The following season proved difficult for the club, however, and after achieving just 15 points after twenty-three Serie A matches, Semplici was sacked as SPAL coach on 10 February 2020.

On 22 February 2021, Semplici was appointed manager of Cagliari. Appointed to replace Eusebio Di Francesco following a dismal first half of the season, Semplici succeeded to turn the Sardinians' fortunes and save Cagliari from relegation, being then confirmed in charge for the 2021–22 Serie A season. However, after achieving one point in the first three games of the season and following a 2–3 home loss to Genoa, Semplici was relieved from managerial duties on 14 September 2021.

Managerial statistics

References

1967 births
Footballers from Florence
Italian footballers
Living people
Italian football managers
Serie A managers
S.P.A.L. managers
Cagliari Calcio managers
Spezia Calcio managers
Association football defenders